Joseph William Foley (born 1821) was an Irish solicitor from Dún Laoghaire, County Dublin who briefly became a nationalist politician.

His father William was from New Ross in County Wexford, and his mother Elizabeth Crawford was from Northumberland. He was educated at St Cuthbert's College in County Durham, and became a solicitor in 1841.
He was also a justice of the peace for County Dublin.
In 1865 he married Julia Cram, from Crofthouse in Northumberland.

Foley was elected at the 1880 general election as a Home Rule League Member of Parliament (MP) for New Ross, defeating the sitting Conservative MP Charles George Tottenham.

However, he resigned his seat in January 1881 by becoming Steward of the Manor of Northstead.
The resulting by-election for his seat was won by the Home Rule candidate John Redmond,
who later became leader of the Irish Parliamentary Party.

References

External links 
 

1821 births
Year of death unknown
Irish solicitors
Members of the Parliament of the United Kingdom for County Wexford constituencies (1801–1922)
UK MPs 1880–1885
Home Rule League MPs
People from New Ross
Alumni of Ushaw College